A with breve (Ӑ ӑ; italics: Ӑ ӑ) is a letter of the Cyrillic script. It may be a homoglyph of the Latin letter A with breve (Ă ă Ă ă) unless the typeface distinguishes between the Latin and Cyrillic breve.

It is used in the Chuvash and Khanty alphabets.

Usage
It is always reduced and can occur stressed only in the first syllable of a polysyllabic word. It is sometimes so reduced as to sound coalesced with the following consonant as in сӑтел table, .

Computing codes

See also
А а : Cyrillic letter A
Ă ă : Latin letter A with breve - a Romanian and Vietnamese letter

External links
Unicode Character 'CYRILLIC CAPITAL LETTER A WITH BREVE' (U+04D0)
Unicode Character 'CYRILLIC SMALL LETTER A WITH BREVE' (U+04D1)

Vowel letters
Cyrillic letters with diacritics
Letters with breve